Prospero's Daughter may refer to:
 Miranda, daughter of the magician Prospero in Shakespeare's play The Tempest
 the Prospero's Daughter trilogy of fantasy novels by L. Jagi Lamplighter
Prospero's Daughter, a novel by Elizabeth Nunez